The ACT Rural Fire Service is a branch of the Australian Capital Territory Emergency Services Agency. It is responsible for the prevention, detection and extinguishment of all bushfires within the ACT, as well as assisting the other branches of ESA.

History

There are very few records regarding bushfires in the Australian Capital Territory (Limestone Plains) from the early 1800s to the first quarter of the twentieth century.

In January 1862 it was reported in the Queanbeyan Age and General Advertiser that large bush fires had raged around Queanbeyan. It is also reported in the Queanbeyan Age that during January 1875 bush fires occurred in all parts of Australia including the Limestone Plains.

In December 1903 two bush fire brigades were formed: the Limestone Plains Brigade and  The "Majura Corps". From the Queanbeyan Age during January and February 1905, there are number of references to Canberra Bush Fires Prevention Committee, which was made up of land owners.

In 1906 a fire crossed the Murrumbidgee River about noon Sunday, 1 January at a spot known as Horseshoe Bend, and was stopped the same day behind Gungahlin Homestead. The fire travelled through Kilby's at the falls, the southern edge of the fire entering the Territory and travelled in an easterly direction. Heavy losses of fencing and stock resulted, buildings destroyed including outbuildings and Kilby's homestead, the old store at Ginninderra and odd buildings at Ginninderra Station.

Sometime after Limestone Plains Brigade and the "Majura Corps" formed the Weetangara Fire Brigade was also formed. Again the Queanbeyan Age from Tuesday 18 January 1910 reports "The Weetangara Fire Brigade burnt several firebreaks around the various holdings before Christmas. Mr. Crace kindly lent his fire-fighter for the purpose."

On 28 October 1915, the Federal Territory Bush Fire Association was formed. The purpose of the Association was "the organised assistance of all concerned, and the co-ordination of effort in (a) the prevention of bush or grass fires in the territory and adjoining country; (b) the adoption of necessary measures for combating any outbreak of bush or grass fire in the territory and the adjoining country."

On 8 November 1927 the Lands Department of the Federal Capital Commission set up the  Bush Fire Organisation to deal with bushfires for the upcoming summer. For the first time the organization would supply Fire fighting equipment such as water carts, fire beaters and rakes as well as establishing depots for fire-fighting appliances at the homes or camps of certain rangers in Canberra. On Monday 14 November 1927 the Bush Fire Control Organization had its inaugural meeting. The Chief Fire Controller was Mr M. R. Jacobs (Chief Forester). The organization set up fire depots at MacDonald's Camp near Weetangera, Weavers' Property near Stromlo, Maxwells' Property at The Rivers, Gregorys' Property at Kambah and Horans' Property near the Yarralumla. The equipment at these depots included fire carts, beaters, rakes & axes, with horses for the fire carts being supplied by various Rural Lessees.

November 1938 to mid-January 1939 were the driest months on record since 1918, with practically no rain in the Territory since November. A heat wave began about 3 January and lasted until 14 January. A fire started in the hills about 40 miles directly behind Uriarra Station (beyond the Goodradigbee River) and had been burning in NSW since Tuesday. Late at night on 13 January, the fires reached the A.C.T. in three main tongues: one near Mt Franklin, one at Two Sticks Road, near Mount Coree and the third near Horseshoe Bend along the northern boundary of the A.C.T. By early morning Saturday 14 January, strong winds gusting up to 70 kilometers per hour started numerous spot fires in the region (maximum spotting distance was 24 kilometers). By Saturday afternoon the fires had raged over a total front of 45 miles along the Murrumbidgee River, and had crossed it at several places.

The Two Sticks Road fire burnt across the Uriarra Pine Plantation, completely destroying it, and was halted along the Murrumbidgee River. Around noon on Saturday a burning ember from the Uriarra Fire started a spot fire at Huntley (about 6 miles away), this fire swept towards Mt Stromlo but was quickly halted about 2 miles away from Mount Stromlo.

The Horseshoe Bend fire spotted across the Murrumbidgee River at the Kurrajong Waterhole. The fire was confined to the north side of the Hall-Kurrajong Road, it then passed through 'Glenwood' Station, and spread into sparsely timbered country on a 5-mile front. It was halted north of Hall.

The Mount Franklin fire burnt right across the Territory. There were serious outbreaks at Tidbinbilla, Cuppacumbalong, Booroomba and Lanyon. Later as it entered New South Wales there were outbreaks around Royalla. A cool change accompanied by rain moved across the Canberra region on Sunday 15 January, extinguishing most fire fronts.

Fortunately there were no deaths, and stock losses were comparatively small, the main losses were to property. 150,000 acres of timbered and grazing land burnt out (including 1100 hectares of pine plantation worth 300,000 pounds) and nearly 40 miles of fencing, particularly in the Tidbinbilla and Uriarra area, were destroyed. These fires covered and estimated 60,000 hectares of forest and grazing land, including 1,100 hectares of pine plantation.

From the 1940s a greater emphasis on planned burning (also known as fuel reduction burning, prescribed burning or controlled burning) was introduced in the ACT as a means of reducing the potential for severe bushfires. The Careless Use of the A.C.T. Fire Ordinance 1936–37, was amended in 1940 to provide for the formation of a Bush Fire Council. The severe bushfires which caused widespread damage in the Australian Capital Territory in January 1939, was the subject of enquiry by a Bush Fire Committee appointed by the Minister of State for the Interior, the Honorable J. McEwen, M.P.; among the recommendations was one favouring the appointment of a permanent Bush Fire Council to organise the prevention and suppression of bushfires in the A.C.T.

In 1943–44 four official bushfire brigades were operating in the A.C.T. The Brigades were Mulligan's Flat, Weetangera, Tuggeranong and Hall. Only Hall is still in existence by name as of 2014.

In 1951–52, several severe bushfires came close to the urban areas of Canberra under the influence of strong westerly winds. Two people died and there was extensive damage to grazing properties across the 13,000 hectares burnt. The Stromlo pine plantation and observatory grounds were also burnt. Total fire bans were imposed from 26 to 28 January and from 1 February to 2 March 1952, inclusively.

In 1978–79 a high fire danger in grasslands developed in late summer when extremely hot dry weather followed a period of substantial rain and prolific grass growth. On 13 February 1979 extreme fire weather conditions prevailed. A grassland fire danger rating of 70 (on a scale of 100) was calculated on the McArthur fire danger meter. This day was to become known as Black Tuesday. Several fires started in the ACT and nearby regions, one in particular began after being ignited from high tension power lines near Hall, and burnt into NSW towards the village of Sutton and Lake George. Twelve fires were attended by Bush Fire Council units that day. The maximum temperature reached was 39 degrees Celsius. The major fire started at Sunny Corner near the Village of Hall. It was first detected by the fire towers at 2.59 pm. Fanned by winds gusting to 70 kilometers per hour, the fire burnt fiercely in a northward direction and quickly grew in size spreading at an estimated 8 kilometers per hour at its worst.

At around 1540 hours the fire approached the Gundaroo Road, around 4 kilometers from the source. Around 1620 hours the fire had reached Gungaderra Homestead (about 7 kilometers from the source), the fire was running in fully cured Phalaris grassland. The fire behaviour was erratic with flame bursts of 4 to 10 metres and huge fire whirls. The town of Sutton N.S.W. was evacuated about 5 pm, when the fire reached the tops of nearby hills and began moving towards the town on a one-kilometer-wide front. A major wind change to the south-west occurred at about 1730 hours, the fire broke out along the entire northern flank and burnt strongly to the north east.

By the time the fire had been controlled, at about 4 am the next day, a total of 165 square kilometers (16 500 hectares) of land had been burnt in the A.C.T.(4 025 hectares) and New South Wales (12 475 hectares). The fire caused losses in the A.C.T. of two cottages, three sheds, machinery and stored fodder, about 5000 sheep, six horses and fencing worth $200 000. On the same day there were other major outbreaks in the A.C.T. at Mount Painter, Tuggeranong, near Kambah Pool and at Lands End Belconnen, where an A.C.T. Fire Brigade Tanker was burnt out.

After the disastrous bushfires of 1951/52 and following representations by the Bush Fire Council in mid-1952, a number of volunteer Bush Fire Brigades were formed.

Numerous bushfire occurred during the severe drought of 1982–83 across Australia, including the notorious Ash Wednesday fires in South Australia and Victoria. In the ACT a fire started on 8 January 1983 down in the Gudgenby area and spread rapidly, burning for 22 days in rugged terrain before being contained. It was one of the largest and most difficult fires ever experienced in the A.C.T. It started near My Kelly, in the South-West corner of the A.C.T., on the evening of 8 January 1983 or early the following morning. The cause is unknown. Initial detection of the fire was seriously delayed because of poor visibility caused by heavy dust in the area on the morning of 9 January. A helicopter was dispatched immediately after the fire was reported, but by the time the fire was located it had already burnt 400 hectares and was spreading rapidly into inaccessible terrain. Although most damage occurred in the first 24 hours, rugged terrain and difficult access often prevented fire fighters from taking advantage of periods of favourable weather conditions. This resulted in the fire continuing and causing additional suppression problems when the weather conditions again worsened.

The main fire was finally contained on 30 January, within 140 kilometers of new and existing firetrails where backburning had been carried out. Apart from two spot fires which caused problems, the fire was successfully held within these breaks. Although the fire burnt 360 square kilometers (36 000 hectares), it did not assume the characteristics of what is known as a disaster fire - there was no loss of life or substantial economic loss (the only real economic loss was 300 hectares of pine plantation), however, there was a major cost with the labour component of the prolonged suppression effort.

The inaugural meeting of the  Volunteer Bush Fire Brigades Association was held on 22 November 1984. Its original objectives/roles were:

1. To act as a focal point for issues affecting all volunteer bushfire fighters in the A.C.T.(there were some 828 members on the various Brigades' books at the time). 
2. Speak on behalf of all A.C.T. volunteer bushfire fighters. 
3. Lobby politicians, bureaucrats & national/local organisations on issues relating to A.C.T. volunteer bushfire fighters. 
4. Provide a forum for discussing improvements to fire management in the A.C.T. 
5. Put forward a joint and considered view to the Emergency Management Group and A.C.T. Government officials on equipment, training, planning and safety issues affecting A.C.T. volunteer bushfire fighters. 
6. Publicise issues on behalf of A.C.T. volunteer bushfire fighters where and when necessary. 
7. Organise public events (Field Days) to make the community more aware of the work done by volunteer bushfire fighters. 
8. Provide an Avenue for transmission of practical suggestions from the people who actually put out a high percentage of the rural fires in the A.C.T.

In 1984–85, a relatively wet winter and spring was followed by an extremely dry summer. This caused a large buildup of plants and fuel for fires, which then rapidly dried out making it highly flammable. As a result, several large fires occur in forest and grassland reserves in and around Canberra, three of which burnt into NSW south of Queanbeyan.

The Majura fire was ignited under suspicious circumstances at 1326 hrs on 2 March 1985, on steep and inaccessible woodland on the southern slopes of Mount Majura; a day of extreme fire danger*. Strong north-westerly winds soon drove the fire downhill into the Majura Pine Plantation before spotting across Majura Road into the Field Firing Range then eastwards through grass and woodland towards Sutton Road and eventually into Wamboin Estate in NSW.

Monday 4 March 1985 was a day of extreme weather and a Total Fire Ban remained in force. At 1534 hours several smoke sighting were called in to the Tharwa Road area. 7 fires were ignited along Tharwa Road ACT, and crossed into the steep and heavily timbered Rob Roy ranges. By late afternoon of 4 March 1985, 6 major fires had run to the north, west and south of Queanbeyan with 2 fires directly threatening built-up areas. The fire burnt out of control up and over Rob Roy Range across the Monaro Highway into NSW before being brought under control. These fires resulted in the death of one person and the burning of 28,000 hectares, of which approximately 10,000 hectares were in the ACT

Until around 1990 rural fire brigades had been manned by landholders, their families and their employees. This system had worked well enough up to a stage with landholders attending fires, for the most part close to home. But with the growth of urban Canberra, Rivers Brigade made the decision to recruit members from suburbs lying close to the brigade's area. Many young people volunteered and the system has worked well, but with a high turn-over of members, but a consistent nucleus of dedicated members have stayed.

The ACT Emergency services went through a major restructure in  November 1996, where several brigades and units from other emergency services were relocated and Molonglo and Gungahlin brigades were established. This was achieved at the Rivers, Guises Creek, Jerrabomberra and Headquarters Brigades by building additional shed space as required to accommodate Australian Capital Territory Emergency Service (ACT SES) equipment (no Australian Capital Territory Emergency Service volunteers were moved to the Southern Districts or Tidbinbilla Volunteer Bushfire Brigades). The new Gungahlin Brigade was located in rented warehouse space in the industrial area of Mitchell until completion of the new Joint Emergency Services Centre at Gungahlin Town Centre.

Whilst the fires of December 2001 were comparatively small in size they were notable in that they were the most serious fires to occur in the suburban areas of the Canberra for some years. On 24 December, fires lit by an arsonist on the Uriarra and Coppins Crossing Roads burnt rapidly through grassland and pine plantation, crossing the Tuggeranong Parkway. A fire started just east of the Canberra Airport in the late morning. It was caused by a youth playing with fireworks.

The Uriarra Road leads down to the Murrumbidgee River from town. On the north is the grazing land of the valley of the Molonglo River; on the south is the scenic Mount Stromlo.

At 13:31 three of our four fire towers reported a smoke plume from the northwest corner of the pines in the vicinity of the "Huntly’ Property on the Uriarra Road. This was called the Huntly fire. At 13:36 a second smoke plume was reported at "Kallenia Rivers", on Coppins Crossing Road, 4.5 km downwind from the first. This was called the Coppins Crossing fire. Both were reported to be building rapidly.

The Huntly fire was burning in grassland with scattered trees on a steep upper slope. The grass fire was spreading at faster than walking pace. It crowned in the trees along the roadside. The fire crossed the Uriarra Road and threatened to run towards the Mt Stromlo pine Plantation, the Adventure Paintball Park in its path. Suppression efforts halted the fire and kept this section of the fire to around 12 hectares. Crews were able to stop the main fire just as it reached a series of homesteads and sheds at Spring Vale, and even saved a full hay shed.

The fire burnt out 64 hectares and was stopped 130 metres short of the pine plantation on Mount Stromlo. It took many days to reopen the Uriarra Road, due to the danger from falling trees – chainsaw operators were in high demand.

The Coppins Crossing fire spread rapidly in grazing land down to the Molonglo River. Before crews could round it up, it crossed the River and started an uphill run in the Greenhills pine plantation. With a mix of slash, young pines and mature pines, the fire behaviour was variable - but always spectacular.

At this point, with the fire spotting up to 300 metres. It threatened the edges of five Canberra suburbs — Duffy, Holder, Weston, Yarralumla and Curtin. The Emergency Services Bureau issued the SEWS (the Standard Emergency Warning Signal) alert to the community for the first time, along with advice to the residents of those suburbs to take certain steps to increase their safety.

The fire crossed the main north–south road in Canberra (Tuggeranong Parkway) and burnt down to the shores of Lake Burley Griffin. It entered the grounds of both the National Zoo & Aquarium and the Governor-General's residence. The Parkway road and many others in the area would remain closed for many days, again due to the threat from falling trees.

The fire veered a little to the right and burnt right to the edge of the suburb of Curtin, and in fact to within 800m of the Emergency Services Bureau. Around here it threatened Forest Park Riding School, Two Sisters Motel, the Yarralumla Woolshed, the Joint Services Staff College, the RSPCA and a number of sites on Heritage Lists.

This fire destroyed millions of dollars of plantation pines, and eventually burnt out many hectares. In its last run it crossed another of our main arterial roads, Adelaide Avenue, and was pulled up next to the Royal Australian Mint.

The exact area of this fire will never be known because it was overrun by a third fire, which was lit deliberately upwind at 14:56. This fire (the Blewitts Fire) was lit in very heavy pine slash 1.5 km upwind. In such heavy fuels (up to 150 tonnes per hectare) it burnt ferociously and could not be approached. Even though burning downslope, the wind was sufficient to quickly whip it into a spreading fire. Later a pipe bomb was defused, by the Police Bomb Squad, near where this fire reached the crews working on the Coppins Crossing fire.

The two fires merged and became the Stromlo Fire. The Stromlo Fire burnt a total of over 1200 hectares which included around 500 hectares of pine plantation and a plantation of Roman Cypress trees.

At 16:00, just after a fire tower reported winds at 90 km/hr, we had a fire reported at the foot of Red Hill. This Nature Park is just south of the Lake Burly Griffith, borders many embassies and is surrounded by suburbs. It was also downwind of the other three fires. This fire quickly raced uphill and crowned. This forced the evacuation of the Red Hill Carousel Restaurant which remained closed for several days.

It eventually burnt 170 hectares while switching between uphill and downhill runs, often as a crown fire.

At the same time that the Red Hill fire was reported, another fire was reported on Bruce Ridge next to the Australian Institute of Sport. This fire was also in Nature Park, in Scribbly Gum and Stringybark woodland, and rapidly became a crown fire. It was 5 km upwind of the heart of Canberra and added another large smoke plume to the urban landscape. A youth hostel in Dryandra Street was evacuated. In all 100 hectares of this park was burned.

On Christmas Day around 11.00am a fire was lit on Canberra Avenue opposite HMAS Harman and burnt towards Oaks Estate, which is an outer suburb of Canberra, just across the railway line from Queanbeyan. It burnt 100 hectares and was stopped from entering an industrial estate and from jumping the railway line.

At 2.30pm a fire was lit on Wanniassa Hills above the southern suburb of McArthur. It was rounded up just before reaching houses, and was small at 17 hectares. There were many other smaller fires like the 10 hectare fire that burnt into the grounds at the Canberra University.

By 9 am on Boxing Day the Country Fire Authority had an advance incident management team working with the ACT incident control team in Curtin, and by 3.30 pm that day, some 56 CFA Volunteer firefighters with 10 tankers were deployed to the Stromlo fire. Late on Thursday, these CFA crews were released and departed to assist NSW.

Helicopters proved invaluable at all of the fires. It was so easy for fires to crown that it was consistently difficult for direct attack to succeed. No backburning was undertaken, partly because there was often no room for one to work, and partly because with the strong winds there was little margin for error. The fact that the winds held on WNW for so long made suppression easier for crews.

From around lunchtime Christmas Eve to 8.00 pm Christmas Day, apart from the five major fires, there were another 33 fires responded to. All up over 1600 hectares were burnt with over 50 km of fire perimeters to patrol, and for up to three weeks afterwards smoke could be seen rising from the fire grounds. No-one was killed, there were few injuries, and no structures were lost (apart from some minor rural ones). They threatened the suburbs of Duffy, Holder, Weston, Yarralumla and Curtin and burnt to the shores of Lake Burley Griffin, destroying 510 hectares of pine plantation.

In 2002, most of Australia experienced one of the most severe droughts on record. On 7 and 8 January 2003 there were numerous lightning strikes over the Australia Alps, which ignited at least 89 fires in Victoria, 74 in NSW and three in the ACT. This would go on to cause the 2003 Canberra bushfires. Those fires not controlled, burnt for over 60 days and eventually covered 1.96 million hectares. Four of these fires directly affected the ACT, starting in the western rangers on 8 January 2003, and gradually increased in size over the following 9 days. Due to severe weather conditions experienced on the 18th the fires spread rapidly out of control across Namadgi National Park, pine plantations and leased grazing lands towards Canberra. Fire then entered into the suburbs of Weston Creek between 2 pm and 6 pm resulting in the deaths of four ACT residents and the burning of 164,000 hectares (or nearly 70%) of land in the Territory. Over 500 houses and most of the Mt Stromlo Observatory were destroyed, fire damage to a further 315 houses, and major damage to various infrastructure and facilities. Ninety percent of Namadgi National Park was burnt (much of it severely) and severe fire damage occurred to the Tidbinbilla Nature Reserve, the Murrumbidgee River Corridor, the Stromlo Pine plantation and pine plantation west of the Murrumbidgee River. The fires also effected the ACT water catchment, and as a result Canberra's water supply.

Since 2003, the ACT has seen relatively few bushfires. The re-growth experienced in the forests since 2003, and the abundant grass growth as a result of the recent rain, means that the risk of severe bushfires is again increasing. However, the ACT RFS has undertaken a major modernization program since 2003 after the McLeod enquiry, including the building new fire sheds, buying new appliances, recruiting more firefighters (both volunteer and seasonal) and taking part in research around bushfires, particularly in the use of Compressed air foam system. As well as being renamed to the ACT Rural Fire Service.

Over time, several brigades have been disbanded or absorbed into others, including the Mount Stromlo Observatory brigade, ACT Forests and ACT RFS HQ Brigade. There doesn't appear to be any information on these brigades, except the occasional mention in reports about fires or pictures in which their call-signs can be seen on the side of the tankers.

Brigades
The ACT RFS has nine RFS Brigades are generally focused on the western areas of the ACT as most fires come with winds from the Brindabella Ranges of the Namadgi National Park and Kosciuszko National Park to the west of the ACT.

Brigades Executive Committees administer the assets and facilities of the Brigade and is made up of members who agree serving as president, Secretary and Treasurer etc. who have no incident or brigade command and control responsibilities. Each brigade has a captain and a number of deputy captains who have command responsibilities.

 The Guises Creek Rural Fire Brigade is located on the corner of Old Cooma Road and the Monaro Highway, near Royalla, New South Wales. Its history goes back to the Williamsdale Bush Fire Brigade which was formed in 1957. The first fire vehicle was a private truck with a 200-gallon water tank, a Finsberry pump and a valve 2-way radio. In the 1960s the Brigade purchased a 1942 Chev "Biltz" unit from the N.S.W. Forestry Department at Bateman's Bay for 300 pounds. This unit had served as a decontamination unit in World War II;  it has been restored and retained for promotional and heritage use. In 1988 the Brigade split into two; these were the Williamsdale Bush Fire Brigade (N.S.W.) and the Guises Creek Volunteer Bushfire Brigade (A.C.T.).

Guises Creek Brigades' catchment area lies on the eastern side of the Tuggeranong Valley; it is made up of 15 rural leases, the Murrumbidgee River Corridor and the Rob Roy Range Nature Park. On 18 June 1994, the Guises Creek Fire Shed was officially opened by the A.C.T. Minister for Urban Services, David Lamont MLA.

 Jerrabomberra RFS Brigade is named after the Jerrabomberra Valley and is now based in Symonston and covers the central and eastern rural areas of the ACT including areas of Mt Ainslie, Mt Mugga, Red Hill, Isaacs Ridge, Kowen Forest. It begun as the Woden Bush Fire Brigade which had its inaugural meeting on 16 July 1952. The Brigade was formed after the devastating fires swept through the Jerrabomberra Valley area earlier that year. Its first AGM was held on 17 September 1952.

The Woden Brigade purchased a unit from funds raised, and limited equipment was provided from the A.C.T. Bush Fire Council. Over the next 20 years or so the Woden Brigade fought fires in the A.C.T. and surrounding area before finally disbanding in the 1970s. Once again after many fires swept through the Jerrabomberra Valley in 1985 and 1986 a proposal was put forward that another volunteer bushfire brigade be formed. A public meeting was held on 29 October 1986, with the Jerrabomberra VBB being officially formed on 11 November 1986.

The A.C.T. Bush Fire Council provided Jerrabomberra VBB with a light unit. The Jerrabomberra Fire Shed was officially opened on 2 May 1992. Around mid 1994 an extension to the Jerrabomberra Fire Shed was commenced, it was constructed in two stages, the first was completed and opened on 3 December 1994. The second stage was completed and opened on 1 April 1995. The extension was built from funds raised by the Brigade and assistance from the A.C.T. Rural Fire Service.

 Southern brigade, based at Tharwa, combines a rural base with closesness to the city, covering the southern area of the ACT, from Lanyon to the NSW border.
 Gungahlin brigade is based at the Gungahlin Joint Emergency Services Complex (JESC) located in the central business area of the most northern town centre in the ACT. The Gungahlin Volunteer Bushfire & Emergency Service Brigade commenced operations on Sunday 9 February 1997. The bushfire component of the brigade initially drew its membership for the Hall and Jerrabomberra Volunteer Brigades. The initial membership consisted of 15 members and the brigade was resourced with:
◾1 Heavy Tanker (single cabin Isuzu),
◾1 Light Unit (Toyota Land Cruiser) and
◾1 Command Vehicle (Toyota Hilux)

The brigade was initially stationed at Mitchell (corner of Heffernan St and Winchcombe Ct). The brigade was relocated to the Gungahlin Joint Emergency Services Centre (JESC) in 1998. The Brigade were heavily involved in the 2001 Christmas fires and were the first (and only for the first 1.5 hours) bushfire units on scene at the Bruce Ridge fire as it spread from near the CIT and encircled the Lyneham Caravan Park. Gungahlin Brigade was heavily involved in operations in the Tidbinbilla Nature Reserve and Tidbinbilla Valley during the 2003 Canberra Bushfires on 17 January 2003 and in the Uriarra Settlement and Weston Creek area on 18 January 2003. The brigade was able to provide crews for at least one shift for 17 days straight during this campaign event.

Gungahlin busiest day for fire activity was Saturday 13 March 1999 which saw the brigade respond to and contain seventeen fires in the one day. This was also coupled with the busiest weekend for the brigade that saw the brigade attend over 30 fires over the three days of the Canberra Day Long Weekend.

 Molonglo brigade is based at Higgins, covering West Belconnen. During the implementation of the restructure in 1996 a new volunteer Bushfire and Emergency Service Brigade was proposed to be formed in the West Belconnen area, which was under-served by bushfire fighting capability. Once funds were earmarked to build a shed for this brigade it quickly became more than a proposal and a meeting of volunteers was held on 6 May 1997 to form the Brigade and decide on a name. As much of the region served by the new Brigade is bordered by the Molonglo River before its confluence with the Murrumbidgee River, "Molonglo" was the name adopted.

Molonglo Brigade membership initially comprised some of the more experienced bushfire members of the Hall Volunteer Bushfire Brigade and some of the Emergency Service members who had originally opted to relocate to the Hall Volunteer Bushfire Brigade (prior to the proposal to form Molonglo Brigade). This was topped up over the next few months as new members joined and by the end of 1997 most of these had been trained to basic skills level. The Brigade Executive was elected at the inaugural Molonglo Volunteer Bushfire and Emergency Service Brigade Annual General Meeting on 24 September 1997 and the new Constitution was formally adopted on 22 October 1997.

 Tidbinbilla Brigade (established on 25 February 1951), began as a group of landholders from the Tidbinbilla Valley and the surrounding region, and serves as the forefront unit for fires coming from the Brindabella Ranges. The Tidbinbilla Bush Fire Brigade was formed at a meeting held on 25 February 1951 at Mr H Woods' homestead. There were 14 local residents at that meeting and the first action taken was the purchase of a Dangar Gedye & Malloch fire fighting unit, from Gibbs & Co, Queanbeyan, at a cost of 180 pounds and 2 knapsack sprays for 7 pounds 18 shillings 6 pence. To raise the money a levy of 15 shillings per hundred head of sheep was set. A selected landholder took responsibility for the fire fighting unit for 12 months. On 25 November 1953, a transceiver set No. 21 was fitted to Flint Brothers' truck. The equipment for the 1954/55 season consisted of one 2-way radio, 2 knapsack sprays, 1x200 gallons (910 L) tank and 1 reel.

From the 1955/56 season the main equipment was permanently stationed at Congwarra, with water bags, metal knapsack sprays, beaters, rakes, tanks and hoses supplied to each landholder. In 1963 big changes took place. The then Fauna Reserve (formerly Rock Valley) was withdrawn from the Tidbinbilla Bush Fire Brigade area, and the Tidbinbilla Tracking Station had become operational. In 1968 the out-dated radio was replaced by a transistorised model, the metal knapsacks were replaced by lighter polythene units, and members were given McLeod tools and water tanks by the Bush Fire Council. A fire tanker, International K6 5 ton truck was purchased from the Department of the Interior in 1969, and it could carry 800 gallons of water.

In 1979 the Bush Fire Council provided a Toyota 4-wheel drive Light Unit and more fire equipment. For a time the International K6 was kept as a backup vehicle, until it had out worn its usefulness and was put up for sale. The area covered by the Tidbinbilla Bush Fire Brigade has decreased over the years, with the extension of ACT Forests (now TAMS) into the valley, the Fauna Reserve became Tidbinbilla Nature Reserve, linked to Namadgi National Park and both Tidbinbilla Tracking Station and Birrigai took over rural land. However, with an increase in traffic and a wider use of the area by the public, the danger of fires has increased.

 Hall brigade is based in the rural village of Hall, aimed at protecting and educating the northern ACT community of Hall and surrounding areas about bushfires. The Hall Bush Fire Brigade was first established in the summer of 1943–44. A bus shelter/fire equipment shed was erected about this time, opposite the Hall Premier Store, from material salvaged from the old Mulligan's Flat School. The shed housed leather beaters, McLeod tools, knap-sack sprays etc. A hand pump used at this time to transfer water is still in the Brigade's Shed.

A 2000-gallon water tank was erected on a high stand on the north/west corner of Victoria and Gladstone Streets, as a fire fighting water source and it was kept full by a Government water tanker. The water supply to Hall had been under consideration for many years. With further persistence from the Hall Progress Association the long-awaited water supply for the Village of Hall became a reality in 1967. The official turning on of the water was performed by the minister, the Hon. J.D. Anthony M.P. on 1 April 1967. At this time a length of canvas and a stand-pipe was given to the village by the A.C.T. Fire Brigade, who showed the locals how to operate them. The new equipment was stored in a box at the Estate Agent's Office (Dalgety's) in Victoria Street.

The original Brigade died out sometime around the late 1960s, partly due to a lack of equipment and also because most residents worked away from the village and were not available during the day. On 13 February 1979, known as "Black Tuesday", a fire started at "Sunny Corner". The majority of losses were in the Hall district. The cause of the fire was a drop-out fuse from a high tension powerline. After the "Black Tuesday" fire, Jim Rochford gathered together a group of locals and in October 1979 under C.F.C.O. Cliff Parsons a new era of the Hall Volunteer Bushfire Brigade commenced. The new Brigade had 14 financial members. The new Brigade's first vehicle was a 4WD Toyota Landcruiser, complete with pump and tank, which was presented to the Brigade in November 1979 by the C.F.C.O. Cliff Parsons.

In 1982 the A.C.T. Bush Fire Council presented the Brigade with a 1962 Bedford tanker (3500 Litres capacity). This vehicle was 'retired' in September 1990, and was loaned to the neighbouring Wallaroo Brigade in N.S.W. A 3-door fire shed was erected in Loftus Street in 1985 after years of negotiations. It was officially opened by the Governor-General, Sir Ninian Stephen, on 19 April 1986. This was the first of the new Government-sponsored fire sheds in the A.C.T.

 Rivers brigade is located on the Cotter Road approximately 1 km west turn off to the Mount Stromlo Observatory, and is unique in that it is co-located with the ACT State Emergency Service Unit. At the inaugural meeting of the Bush Fire Control Organisation on 14 November 1927, it directed that a number of fire depots were to be set up, including one at The Rivers property. The homestead on The Rivers was then situated adjacent to Uriarra Road,

After the disastrous bushfires of 1951/52 and following representations by the Bush Fire Council in mid-1952, a number of volunteer Bush Fire Brigades were formed including the Rivers Bush Fire Brigade. It was decided that The Rivers Brigade would be conducted jointly with the Fairlight/Uriarra Brigade. Around 1962 the brigades merged and renamed themselves the Fairlight-The Rivers Bush Fire Brigade.

In 1972, because of the urban development in the Weston Creek and Kambah areas, it was decided to merge the remnant areas of the Kambah Bush Fire Brigade with Fairlight-The Rivers Bush Fire Brigade. This composite brigade was called Uriarra-Stromlo-Central South and Fairlight (in N.S.W.). The area covered included the old Fairlight-The Rivers Brigade area plus land lying east to Jerrabomberra Creek, south to Kambah Pool Road and running up to the Cotter Road, excluding urban areas. In 1980 Bush Fire Council allocated a Bedford tanker to this composite brigade, to be garaged at Fairlight.

At a meeting on 31 August 1989, the Fairlight Bush Fire Brigade decided to confine its operations to New South Wales. At the instigation of Bush Fire Council a public meeting was held on 10 October 1989, at Stomlo Depot, to decide if a new Bush Fire Brigade should be set up covering the old Fairlight-The Rivers Brigade area in the A.C.T. The meeting voted in favour of setting up a new brigade. On 11 October 1989 BFC endorsed the formation of the new Brigade.

At the Brigade's AGM on 29 October 1992, it was decided to write to the Australian Capital Territory BFC requesting a permanent fire shed be built for the Brigade. For the next couple of years various sites were proposed, offers made and withdrawn. In September 1994 the Brigade was given the temporary use of the old CSIRO's experimental sawmill site on the corner of Eucumbene Drive and Cotter Road.

In September 1995 a site was offered by Australian Capital Territory Forests just off the Cotter Road. On Thursday 13 June 1996 construction was commenced and on Sunday 1 December 1996 the Brigade moved into their new home. The Australian Capital Territory Government in November 1996 made the decision to co-locate Australian Capital Territory Emergency Service (ACT SES) personnel with the volunteer bushfire brigades and on 1 February a number of Emergency Service volunteers from the Phillip Depot moved into the Rivers Shed. Shortly after a second shed was constructed on the site to provide a training room and additional storage/vehicle garaging for the Brigade. Finally some 70 years after the Bush Fire Control Organisation first set up a fire depot in the Rivers area, the Minister for Australian Capital Territory Police and Emergency Services, Gary Humphries opened the Rivers Shed on Saturday 21 June 1997.

 TAMS Parks Brigade, is a brigade made up of Parks personnel from TAMS and is supplemented during the fire season with full-time seasonal firefighters. At some point the ACT Forests Brigade was merged into the Parks brigade.

Additionally, local fire units are organised on the margins of the ACT's rural boundary, with members drawn from residents of suburbs bounding the grassland/suburban interface. Small trailers with equipment are placed within suburbs, and the local members rehearse first-aid firefighting regularly before and during the fire season to provide a first response to local issues.

Training and call-out
Training differ from brigade to brigade. Some brigades will have members train one night a week, others once a fortnight. It is often very fluid based on the business of the fire season, or if it is currently in fire season or not. This is in addition to call-outs, hazard reduction burns, community engagement and skills training provided by the ESA. Qualifications are achieved and required under the Australian Qualifications Framework.

Call-out is arranged by Brigades, and through the ACT Emergency Services Agency, using mobile phone text messages, emails and the newly adopted BART system.

Equipment

Brigades have various numbers and combinations of:
 Heavy Tanker (Call signed "Brigade 1#", Example "Jerrabomberra 10")
 CAF Tanker (Denoted by a C at in the call sign, Example "Guises Creek 12C")
 Medium Tanker (Call signed "Brigade 3#", Example "Southern 32")
 Light Unit (Call signed "Brigade 2#", Example "Molonglo 20")
 Command Unit (Call signed "Brigade #", Example "Southern 1")
 Support Trailer (Call signed "Brigade 4#, Example "Tidbinbilla 40")

Communications are coordinated with the ACT Emergency Services and New South Wales Rural Fire Service.

See also
 ACT Fire and Rescue
 2003 Canberra bushfires

References

External links
 Official web site - including warnings and active alerts
 Firebreak
 Gungahlin RFB
 Southern RFB
 Rivers RFB
 ACT RFS BlogSpot
 ACT RFS Facebook page
 TAMS Bushfire Page

Organisations based in Canberra
Emergency services in the Australian Capital Territory
Fire and rescue services of Australia